The Irish League in season 1910–11 comprised 8 teams, and Linfield won the championship after a play-off with Glentoran (Playoff: Linfield Belfast-Glentoran Belfast 3-2).

League standings

Results

References
Northern Ireland - List of final tables (RSSSF)

1910-11
1910–11 in European association football leagues
Irish